Steffond O'Shea Johnson (born November 4, 1962) is a retired American basketball player. He was a 6'8" 240 lb. forward and played one season in the NBA for the Los Angeles Clippers, by whom he was selected in the 1986 NBA draft (5th round, 100th pick overall).

Johnson played competitively at Longview High School, and college basketball at Louisiana State University and San Diego State University.

After his short NBA career, Johnson played in the CBA for six seasons.  He averaged 12 points and 5.1 rebounds per game.  He also played professionally in Turkey, Cyprus, Uruguay, Italy, Venezuela, Philippines (Red Bull) and Puerto Rico.

References

External links
NBA stats @ basketballreference.com
Where Are They Know? - Steffond Johnson, National Basketball Retired Players Association website. Published on March 24, 2005

1962 births
Living people
African-American basketball players
American expatriate basketball people in Cyprus
American expatriate basketball people in Italy
American expatriate basketball people in the Philippines
American expatriate basketball people in Turkey
American expatriate basketball people in Venezuela
American expatriate basketball people in Uruguay
American men's basketball players
Basketball players from Texas
Los Angeles Clippers draft picks
Los Angeles Clippers players
LSU Tigers basketball players
Oklahoma City Cavalry players
People from Longview, Texas
Philippine Basketball Association imports
San Diego State Aztecs men's basketball players
San Jose Jammers players
Santa Barbara Islanders players
Small forwards
Tri-City Chinook players
Wichita Falls Texans players
Wyoming Wildcatters players
21st-century African-American people
20th-century African-American sportspeople